Finland competed at the 2009 World Championships in Athletics, 15–23 August 2009. A team of 20 athletes was announced in preparation for the competition. The selected athletes had achieved at least one of the competition's qualifying standards. The team failed to win any medals; defending world champion javelin thrower Tero Pitkämäki managed only a fifth-place finish.

Team selection

Track and road events

Field and combined events

Results

Men
Track and road events

Field events

Women
Track and road events

Field and combined events

See also
2009 Finnish Athletics Championships

References

External links
Official competition website

Nations at the 2009 World Championships in Athletics
World Championships in Athletics
2009